The women's individual recurve competition at the 2003 World Archery Championships took place in July 2003 in New York City, United States. 138 archers entered the competition. Following a qualifying 144 arrow FITA round the top 64 archers qualified for the 6-round knockout tournament, drawn according to their qualification round scores. The semi-finals and finals then took place on 20 July.

Qualifying
The following archers were the leading 8 qualifiers:

Full draw

Section 1

Section 2

Section 3

Section 4

Finals

References

2003 World Archery Championships
World